Nesting may refer to:

Science and technology
 Building or having a nest
 Nesting instinct, an instinct in pregnant animals to prepare a home for offspring
 Nesting (computing), a concept of information organized recursively
 Nesting (process), a process of efficiently manufacturing parts from flat raw material
 Nesting algorithm for optimal packing
 Nested sampling algorithm, a method in Bayesian statistics
 Nested variation or nested data, described at restricted randomization
 Nested case-control study, a case when this occurs

Other uses
 Nesting (voting districts), the process of combining or splitting of voting districts
 Nesting, Shetland, in Scotland
 The Nesting, a 1981 American slasher film directed by Armand Weston
 Nesting (film), a 2011 American romantic comedy film

See also
 All articles beginning with Nesting
 Nest (disambiguation)
 Matryoshka doll, a Russian nested doll